Dauphin Lake is located in western Manitoba near the city of Dauphin, Manitoba. The Mossy River drains the lake into Lake Winnipegosis.

The lake is located within the territory of three rural municipalities; in descending order of area they are the RM of Ochre River, the RM of Dauphin, and the RM of Mossey River.

Dauphin Lake was named after the Dauphin of France, heir to the French throne, by Francois de La Verendrye in 1739.

Hydrography 

Dauphin Lake is located west of Lake Manitoba and south of Lake Winnipegosis. It receives most of its waters from the west.

Mossy River Dam 
Several efforts have been made to control lake levels in the last century. In 1964, the Mossy River Dam was constructed at Terin's Landing at the outlet of the lake. The ten bay concrete stoplog structure complete with a fish ladder is operated by the Province of Manitoba. The summer target since 1993 has been 854.8 feet (260.54 m). The dam can restrict the outflow when conditions are dry and levels low but the river limits the outflow when the lake is high.

Regulation of the lake is difficult. Conditions can change very quickly.

Tributaries 
 
Tributaries of Dauphin Lake include the Turtle River, Kerosene Creek, Ochre River, Edwards Creek Drain, Vermillion River, Wilson River, Valley River, Mowat Creek and the Mink River.

See also
List of lakes of Manitoba

References

Further reading 
Hind, Henry Youle (1860).  Narrative of the Canadian Red River Exploring Expedition of 1857. London: Longmans.
1916: David Thompson's narrative of his explorations in western America, 1784–1812 (edited by J.B. Tyrell)

Lakes of Manitoba
Bodies of water of Parkland Region, Manitoba